The Vysokyi Training Centre is the training facility of the Ukrainian Premier League club Metalist Kharkiv and its U-19 side located near Kharkiv. Since the centre's opening, upgrades have been made including a rehabilitation centre, gymnasium, canteen, consulting room, medical offices, and many other services.

Description
The Vysokyi Training Centre consists of several playing association football fields, a hotel complex and a rehabilitation center. It was completely rebuilt in preparation to the UEFA Euro 2012. During the UEFA Euro 2012, it was housing national teams of Denmark, Germany, and Portugal.

Beside Metalist, Vysokyi also hosted games of women football clubs WFC Zhytlobud-1 Kharkiv and WFC Zhytlobud-2 Kharkiv.

References

External links 

Football venues in Kharkiv Oblast
Vysokyi
FC Metalist Kharkiv
FC Metalist 1925 Kharkiv
Sports venues in Kharkiv Oblast